The Laulau Kattan Latte Site is a prehistoric archaeological site on the island of Saipan in the Northern Mariana Islands.  Located near the shore of Laulau Bay, it is a small village site containing the remains of four latte stone house foundations, and an extensive scattering of pottery artifacts.  When first reported by the pioneering archaeologist Alexander Spoehr in the 1940s, the latte stones were described as mostly fallen over and extremely weathered.

The site was listed on the National Register of Historic Places in 2000.

See also
National Register of Historic Places listings in the Northern Mariana Islands

References

Archaeological sites on the National Register of Historic Places in the Northern Mariana Islands
Buildings and structures completed in 1670
1670 establishments in the Spanish East Indies
1670 establishments in Oceania